Kelvin Rogelio Jimenez Peña (born October 27, 1980) is a Dominican former professional baseball relief pitcher. He played in Major League Baseball (MLB) for the St. Louis Cardinals.

Career
Jiménez made his major league debut on April 27, for the St. Louis Cardinals. On November 3, he was claimed off waivers by the Toronto Blue Jays. He was then claimed off waivers on November 17,  by the Chicago White Sox.

Jiménez signed with the Doosan Bears in the KBO league for the 2010 season.

External links

1980 births
Living people
Baseball players at the 2015 Pan American Games
Charlotte Knights players
Dominican Republic expatriate baseball players in Japan
Dominican Republic expatriate baseball players in South Korea
Dominican Republic expatriate baseball players in the United States
Doosan Bears players
Frisco RoughRiders players
Gulf Coast Rangers players
KBO League pitchers
Major League Baseball pitchers
Major League Baseball players from the Dominican Republic
Memphis Redbirds players
Nippon Professional Baseball pitchers
Oklahoma RedHawks players
People from Sánchez Ramírez Province
St. Louis Cardinals players
Stockton Ports players
Tohoku Rakuten Golden Eagles players
Pan American Games competitors for the Dominican Republic